Empis clausa is a species of dance fly in the family Empididae. It is a common species in the Midwest and Great Plains regions of North America.

References

Empis
Articles created by Qbugbot
Insects described in 1895